Matua Mahasangha is a religious reformation movement that originated, around 1860 AD, in modern-day Bangladesh, with a considerable number of adherents both in Bangladesh and in West Bengal of India. Matua is a sect of depressed class AVARNA Hindus who are Namasudras, a Scheduled Caste group. The movement was launched as a reformation by the followers of Harichand Thakur. Thakur attained atmadarshan at an early age and would subsequently preach his Darshan in Twelve Commandments. The teachings of Thakur establish education as preeminently important for the adherent and the upliftment of the population the adherent's duty, while also providing a formula for ending social conflict.

Matua-mahasangha believe in Swayam-Dikshiti ("Self-Realisation") through the chanting of Harinaam, i.e., chanting the Holy name of God Hari. Harichand stressed the congressional chanting of Lord's name kirtan as the sole means to Mukti. His followers in 19th century were enchanted by congregational chanting of Lord Hari, which in Bengali called 'hariname matuara' giving the sect current name 'Matua'. So anyone who has faith in the Darshan or Philosophy of God Harichand belongs to the Matua-mahasangha.

History 
Harichand Thakur was born to a peasant family belonging to the Namasudra community. According to historian Sekhar Bandyopadhyay, Thakur "experienced atma darshan or self revelation, through which he realized that he was the incarnation of God himself, born in this world to bring salvation to the downtrodden". Reforming Vaishnava devotionalism, he established the Matua sect of Hinduism. The sect was centered in Thakur's ancestral village, Orakandi, Faridpur, Bengal Presidency (now in Bangladesh). Their most sacred shrines are located there.

A Matua Mahasangha (Matua Federation) was formed by an adherenet before 1915 to organize devotees. In the early 1930s, Pramatha Ranjan Thakur, great-grandson of Harichand Thakur, rejuvenated the organization. It started an ashram in the Labanchora neighborhood of Khulna. After Partition in 1947, large numbers of Matua migrants settled in West Bengal, India. Pramatha Ranjan Thakur was among them. He founded the town of Thakurnagar, which became the new headquarters of the Matua Mahasangha.

Notes and references

Notes

References

External links
 

Bengal Presidency
Hindu denominations
Hindu new religious movements